Manuel Solis (24 December 1889 – 2 January 1984) was a Mexican sports shooter. He competed in two events at the 1924 Summer Olympics.

References

External links
 

1889 births
1984 deaths
Mexican male sport shooters
Olympic shooters of Mexico
Shooters at the 1924 Summer Olympics
Place of birth missing
Date of birth unknown